Jim Dandy may refer to:

 "Jim Dandy" (song) by LaVern Baker, American rhythm and blues singer
 Jim "Dandy" Mangrum (born 1948), vocalist for Black Oak Arkansas
 Jim Dandy Stakes, an American Thoroughbred horse race
 Jim Dandy (horse), the upset winner of the 1930 Travers Stakes, after whom the Jim Dandy Stakes is named
 Jim Dandy Stable

See also
 James Edgar Dandy (1903–1976), British botanist